Platea may refer to:

Plataea, an ancient Greek city-state in Boeotia
Platea, Pennsylvania, a borough in Erie County, Pennsylvania, United States
Platea (plant), a genus of plants
Plataea (moth), a genus of moths